Lecidea keimioeensis (originally published as keimioeënsis) is a species of crustose lichen. This species was the last one described by Vainio before he had to go to the hospital for a sudden illness, where he died two weeks later. Since its original publication, it has scarcely been reported in the scientific literature. In a 1997 assessment report about the inclusion criteria for a Finnish Regional Red List, the species was described as an example of "probably curiosities known to only one researcher".

See also
 List of Lecidea species

References

Lecideales
Lichen species
Fungi of Europe
Taxa named by Edvard August Vainio
Lichens described in 1934